Showdown is a 1973 American Western film produced and directed by George Seaton and starring Rock Hudson, Dean Martin and Susan Clark.

Plot
Childhood friends Billy Massey and Chuck Jarvis go in opposite directions after Chuck ends up married to Billy's former sweetheart. Billy becomes a bank robber, Chuck a lawman. But they end up joining forces against common enemies in a final showdown. A series of life circumstances put two close childhood friends pitted against each other. The seemingly inevitable ending takes a twist that allows the friendship to continue after Billy commits an act of bravery that he knows is suicidal but saves Chuck's life.

Cast
 Rock Hudson as Chuck Jarvis 
 Dean Martin as Billy Massey
 Susan Clark as Kate Jarvis 
 Donald Moffat as Art Williams
 John McLiam as F.J. Wilson
 Charles Baca as Martinez
 Jackson Kane as Clem
 Ben Zeller as Perry Williams
 John Richard Gill as Earl Cole
 Philip L. Mead as Jack Bonney
 Rita Rogers as Girl
 Vic Mohica as Big Eye
 Raleigh Gardenhire as Joe Williams 
 Ed Begley Jr. as Pook
 Dan Boydston as Rawls

Production notes
It was the final film for Seaton, who three years earlier had directed Martin and an all-star cast in the blockbuster hit Airport.  It was also Dean Martin's last western.

In a November 1972 episode of the TV series McMillan & Wife called “Cop of the Year,” McMillan (played by Hudson) visits the set of a Western film titled "Showdown" that is in production  (directed by Seaton, who plays himself) to ask the special-effects supervisor about how to make a gunshot wound appear on the chest of a gunman—who, in the shot being filmed, is the victim in a showdown.

Reception
Quentin Tarantino later wrote that "the slightness of the whole project is surprising. But along with the pairing of Hudson & Martin, who share the screen for the first time, it’s the films low-key modesty that ends up being one of its most charming features."

See also
 List of American films of 1973

References

External links

1973 Western (genre) films
1973 films
American Western (genre) films
Films directed by George Seaton
Films scored by David Shire
Films produced by George Seaton
1970s English-language films
1970s American films